Mitiglinide (INN, trade name Glufast) is a drug for the treatment of type 2 diabetes.

Mitiglinide belongs to the meglitinide (glinide) class of blood glucose-lowering drugs and is currently co-marketed in Japan by Kissei and Takeda. The North America rights to mitiglinide are held by Elixir Pharmaceuticals. Mitiglinide has not yet gained FDA approval.

Pharmacology
Mitiglinide is thought to stimulate insulin secretion by closing the ATP-sensitive potassium KATP channels in pancreatic β cells.

Dosage
Mitiglinide is delivered in tablet form.

References

External links 
 Elixir Pharmaceuticals — website of the U.S. rights holder for mitiglinide.

Carboxamides
Isoindoles
Meglitinides
Potassium channel blockers